The lateral nuclear group is a collection of nuclei on the lateral side of the thalamus. According to MeSH, it consists of the following:
 lateral dorsal nucleus
 lateral posterior nucleus
 pulvinar

Thalamic nuclei